Charles Conaway is an American businessman who is best known for having been the CEO of Kmart. He has also been the President and Chief Operating Officer of CVS Corporation.

Academic background
Conaway holds an MBA from the University of Michigan.

Career
Before joining Kmart, Conaway was the President and COO of CVS Corp. Conaway became Chairman and CEO of Kmart in April, 2000.

S.E.C. lawsuit
In 2005, the U.S. Securities and Exchange Commission filed a lawsuit that accused him of misleading Kmart investors prior to the company's bankruptcy in 2002. The S.E.C. originally sought $22 million from Conaway.  A jury found him liable in a trial four years later, in 2009. While he initially appealed the decision, Conaway dropped his appeal in November 2010 and agreed to pay a $5.5 million settlement.

References

American businesspeople in retailing
Sears Holdings people
Kmart
Ross School of Business alumni
Living people
Year of birth missing (living people)